The Kindaruma Hydroelectric Power Station, also Kindaruma Dam is an embankment dam with two gravity dam sections on the Tana River in Kenya. It straddles the border of Embu and Machakos counties in Kenya. The primary purpose of the dam is hydroelectric power generation and it supports a  power station. It is Kenya's first post-independence hydroelectric power plant. It was commissioned in 1968 as part of the Seven Forks Scheme. The power station is operated by Kenya Electricity Generating Company.

Between 2007 and 2013 the power station underwent a rehabilitation and upgrade which increased its installed capacity from 40 MW to 72 MW. In June 2012 a third Kaplan turbine-generator, rated at 24 MW, was commissioned. In January and June 2013, the original two 20 MW Kaplan turbine-generators were upgraded to 24 MW each.

See also 

 Gitaru Dam – upstream
 Kiambere Dam – downstream
 List of power stations in Kenya
 List of hydropower stations in Africa

References 

Energy infrastructure completed in 1968
Hydroelectric power stations in Kenya
Dams on the Tana River (Kenya)
Dams in Kenya
Dams completed in 1968
Machakos County
Embu County
Embankment dams
Gravity dams